The air bag vest is a personal safety device worn by some motorcyclists and horse riders. Airbag vests initially found popularity among equestrian competitors, and airbags have become mandatory in professional motorcycle racing. In 2018, it became compulsory across all classes within the FIM MotoGP World Championship for riders’ race suits to be fitted with airbag systems.

In horse riding, the device is worn over a standard padded vest and is automatically inflated by gas released from a carbon dioxide canister when a tether attached to the horse's saddle is extended during a fall.

While early motorcycle vests followed this approach, the technology has advanced: modern systems use a set of onboard sensors (accelerometer, gyroscope and GPS) that analyse the motorcyclist's movements more than 1000 times a second. An onboard AI computer uses this sensor data to predict the start of a crash and inflate the airbag before the rider hits the ground or a hard object. Germany's ADAC tested these systems and found that the speed of detection and inflation mattered.  More comprehensive research by Ballester et al. also found that the speed of inflation was critical for safety, with tethered systems too slow to inflate in some accident scenarios.

Electronic airbags – either integrated into the motorcyclist's jacket or worn over it – have started to become more common among regular riders on the street. Manufacturers of electronic systems include In&Motion, Alpinestars, Helite (E-Turtle) and Dainese.

Description and availability – horse riding
The device weighs approximately two pounds and is worn over a standard protective high density foam vest. Connected by a cord to the horse's saddle, a carbon dioxide canister is punctured when the cord is extended during a fall, inflating the vest in 100 to 250 milliseconds. Unlike car air bags, the air bag vests can be repacked and reloaded for reuse with a new CO2 cartridge. Companies that manufacture the vests created them for motorcyclists as early as 1999. Point Two Air Jackets, a British manufacturer, began selling the device for horse riders starting in 2009 and the Japanese company Hit Air has a similar device, which sell for about $400 to $700 depending on the model. In the US, companies such as MotoAir-USA started to spring up, using similar technology. As of 2010, Point Two estimated that 6,000 eventing riders wore its vests, while Hit Air estimated that 10,000 of its vests were being used. The United States Team at the FEI World Equestrian Games in 2010 planned to provide riders with air bag vests.

Effectiveness in horse riding
Studies conducted by the British Transport Research Laboratory showed that the vests improved protection by 69% when worn by riders in conjunction with a standard protective vest and cut the risk of rib fractures and damage to internal organs by 20%. Studies performed by the TRL for Point Two showed a reduction exceeding 55% in the chest compression experienced while wearing the vest compared to unprotected falls, and that chest compression was cut in half of the maximum limit set by the U.S. National Highway Traffic Safety Administration for chest compression in automobile crashes. At a competition in France held in September 2009, rider Karim Florent Laghouag was able to walk away from a fall in which his horse somersaulted over a fence with his only injury a dislocated elbow. Similar types of rotational falls had resulted in the death of 13 riders in the four-year span through 2010. In 2010, British rider Oliver Townend described the vest as "the biggest step forward in the safety of our sport, ever". Townend had his horse fall on top of him while participating in the Rolex Kentucky Three Day in Lexington, Kentucky, and despite a broken sternum and four cracked ribs, credited the vest with allowing him to leave the hospital after only one day, saying that without the vest he "would be in a box or in America for a month".

Effectiveness in motorcycling
In motorcycling, Ballester et al. defined the critical information for airbag efficiency assessment: the zones and levels of protection, the impacted surfaces as well as the airbag intervention time and the duration of maintained inflation of the airbag. Also, earlier work by Thollon et al. analysed the effectiveness of airbag protection for reducing thoracic injuries in motorcycle accidents. However, more research is needed regarding neck protection for motorcyclists. Some manufacturers' airbags protect the neck from extreme movement in a crash, but many lack this protection.

Independent research found that current airbags are effective and provide significant impact protection, but only under 30 mph. Initial investigation by ADAC found: “Increased protection potential is primarily only effective in accidents up to 50 Km/h.” In 2019, Thierry Serre et al. published more in-depth research (involving not only impact tests on cadavers but detailed analyses of actual crashes involving riders wearing an airbag). They found that: “The airbag jackets seem to offer limited protection from a threshold speed which can be estimated to an impact around to 30-40 Km/h, but these speeds differ with the impact configuration.”

Unmet needs for motorcyclists
Lower limb damage is the most frequent injury for motorcyclists. Kortor et al. (2010) found: "Lower limb injuries represent the commonest form of injuries among the motorcycle accident victims. Fractures were the commonest type of injury seen and the most common location was shaft of tibia." Consequently, the Protective Innovations of New Equipment for Enhanced Rider Safety (PIONEERS) research project is investigating the effectiveness of fitting a motorcycle with lateral airbags to protect the rider's legs. And in May 2022, Motorcycle News reported that a Swedish company, Airbag Inside, plans to launch airbag-equipped jeans for motorcycling.

It has been found that back protectors are ineffective, causing the hope that airbags can address this protection deficiency. Ekmejian et al., Afquir et al. and Zulkipli et al. all found that back protectors fail to protect against the leading cause of spinal injury, compression fractures. In short, “the motorcyclist falls from the motorcycle and onto their buttocks”, and back protectors do not cover this area (although a very few include coccyx protection). This failing also applies to airbags, which usually fail to cover the tailbone or backside.  Afquir et al. argued that the design of back protectors needs a rethink, and this finding applies equally to airbags for motorcyclists.

Certification

Airbag standards for motorcycle riders
In 2013, The European Union created a standard for motorcyclists’ airbags. It specified the minimum inflation speed, inflation duration, inflation volume and amount of force absorbed. There are two levels of performance: level 1 for airbag systems with adequate protection and level 2 for airbags with enhanced impact absorption.

However, this European standard only concerns mechanically operated airbags. While the manufacturers of most electronic systems have certified their airbags to the European standard, it was not designed for them. Crucially, this standard does not consider the effectiveness of their computer algorithms.

Research by Raúl Aranda-Marco et al., published in 2020, found serious limitations in the European standard for airbags (EN 1621-4).
In 2021, PIONEERS research found that a more severe test (compared to the European standard) was closer to an actual crash scenario.

Airbag standards for horse riders
Following a detailed research project funded by the Injured Jockeys Fund and conducted by independent test house SATRA in conjunction with the British Racehorse Authority, a standard was established for the use of airbag vests by jockeys, and an amended version covering the use of airbag vests for riders across all other equestrian disciplines. 
 SATRA M38: February 2013 – Requirements for air-vests, for use in horse riding, intended to give protection in the event of a fall to the ground
 SATRA M39: February 2013 - Requirements for jockeys' body protectors additionally incorporating airbag technology.

The SATRA standards cover ergonomics, the total area covered by the airbag, impact attenuation, activation force, lanyard strength, lanyard length, inflation speed and pressures. Most air jacket manufacturers have adopted these standards.

Motorcycle airbag usage by professional motorcyclists
In MotoGP racing, airbags have been worn since 2007 and compulsory since 2018. Japanese police motorcyclists have used lanyard-based airbags for many years, and other police riders have used them for some time too (e.g. advanced riding instructors at Thames Valley Police Driving School, UK). In 2019, Britain's Gloucester police became one of the first police forces to equip its riders with electronically triggered airbags.

Airbag-equipped helmets for motorcycling
In December 2022, Motorcycle News reported on helmet manufacturer Airoh collaborating with Swedish safety firm Autoliv to produce an airbag-equipped helmet: "Airbag systems are nothing new in biking. Once a safety net reserved for the MotoGP elite, they’re now found in everything from standalone vests to adventure jackets, to bespoke leathers. However, Italian company Airoh wants to take this a step further by integrating the explosive safety technology into a motorcycle helmet – revealing a striking prototype model at this year’s Milan show in early November."Sutherland, D. (2022) Airheads: World's first integrated airbag helmet unveiled by Airoh, MCN. Motorcycle News. Available at: https://www.motorcyclenews.com/news/new-tech/airoh-helmet-airbag/ (Accessed: December 5, 2022).

References

Protective gear
Airbags
Vests